Lepidochrysops nigritia is a butterfly in the family of Lycaenidae. It is native to South Sudan.

References

Butterflies described in 1959
Butterflies of Africa
Endemic fauna of South Sudan
Lepidochrysops